The Summerville Depot, at 120 E. Washington Ave. in Summerville, Georgia, was built in 1918.  It was listed on the National Register of Historic Places in 1992.

It is a one-story frame Prairie School-style depot building.  It has a hipped roof and wide eaves, and weatherboard siding above tongue-and-groove exterior wainscoting.

It was a passenger train stop on the Central of Georgia's Griffin and Chattanooga division.

Ownership of the building was acquired in 1989 by the Chattooga County Historical Society, along with a long-term lease on the land with Norfolk Southern Corporation.  It planned to restore the depot for use by the historical society and other civic organizations and to include museum exhibits.  When listed in 1992, there were plans for an original block and tackle and telegraph key to be restored to the property.

It was deemed "an excellent example of a combination railroad passenger and freight depot constructed in the
early 1900s."

References

External links
 

Museums in Chattooga County, Georgia
Former Central of Georgia Railway stations
National Register of Historic Places in Chattooga County, Georgia
Prairie School architecture
Buildings and structures completed in 1918
Former railway stations in Georgia (U.S. state)